Peyton Randolph Evans (October 18, 1892 – February 24, 1972) was an American football player and coach.  He was the head football coach at the University of Virginia in 1916.  Evans attended Virginia Polytechnic Institute, where he played football.

Evanslater worked as a lawyer in Prince George, Virginia and served as a counsel and executive secretary of the Washington Newspaper Publishers Association. He died in 1972.

Head coaching record

References

External links
 

1892 births
1972 deaths
Virginia Cavaliers football coaches
Virginia Tech Hokies football players
Virginia lawyers
People from Amherst, Virginia
People from Prince George, Virginia
20th-century American lawyers